Crambus damotellus is a moth in the family Crambidae. It was described by William Schaus in 1922. It is found in Mexico.

References

Crambini
Moths described in 1922
Moths of Central America